Ghargaon  is an old village in a Tehsil Shrigonda in Ahmednagar District in the Indian state of Maharashtra. It is located 260 km distance from its State Capital Mumbai and 110 km from Pune.

Geography
It has an average elevation of 561 metres (1840 feet).

Nearby towns are Ahmednagar (41 km), Rahuri (71.5 km), Pathardi (73.9 km), Nevasa (93.8 km), Pune (110 km).

Transport
The village is on State Highway 10 and can be reachable by the following means of transportation:
 from Ahmednager- Ghargaon (State Transport Bus)
 From Shirur, Pune - Belwandi (State Transport Bus)- Belwandi Phata - Ghargaon.
 From Daund - Belwandi bk (railway station) by any passenger rail.

References

Villages in Ahmednagar district